Three and a half Shakti Peethas (prominent seats of the Hindu Goddess) are reported in Maharashtra.

These four Goddess temples are:

 Mahalakshmi Temple, in Kolhapur district
 Tulja Bhavani Temple at Tuljapur in Dharashiv district
 Renuka Temple at Mahur (Matripur) in Nanded district
 Saptashrungi Temple of Vani in Nashik district.  This is known as a half Shakti Peeth of Goddess Shakti.

Mahalaxmi

The Mahalaxmi (also known as Ambabai) Temple situated in Kolhapur, Maharashtra, India, is one of the 18 Maha Shakti Peethas listed in skanda puran, and one of 52 Shaktipeeths according to various Puranas of Hinduism. According to these writings, a Shakti Peetha is a place associated with Shakti, the Goddess of power. This is the place where maa Sati's 3 eyes fell. The Kolhapur Shakti Peetha is of special religious significance being one of the six places where it is believed that one can either obtain salvation from desires or have them fulfilled. Kolhapur Peeth is also known as Karvir Peeth or Shree Peetham. Lakhs of devotees visit the temple every year, from all over Maharashtra, Karnataka and Telangana.

Tulja Bhavani

Tulja Bhavani Temple is a Hindu temple dedicated to the goddess parvati. Goddess parvati live here in her tulja bhavani form. She is also known as the adishakti. She is guardian goddess [ kulswanimi ] of Bharat. It is located in Tuljapur in Osmanabad district of Maharashtra and is considered as one of the 51 Shakti Pithas. It is situated 45  km from Solapur. The temple was built in c. 12th century CE.

Renuka

Reṇukā/Renu is a Hindu goddess worshipped predominantly in the Indian state of Maharashtra."Renu" means "Atom/Mother of Universe" She is also worshipped in the South Indian states of Andhra Pradesh, Himachal Pradesh, Karanataka, Tamil Nadu, and Telangana. Renuka's temple at Mahur in Maharashtra is considered one of the shakti peethas. another temple of renuka is kokan worshipped as padmakshi renuka it is also shakti peeth among 108 peethas but not considered in main 1/3 shaktipeeth of Maharashtra.Renuka is also called as "Renu" which means "Atom/Mother of Universe".

Saptashrungi

According to Hindu traditions, the goddess Saptashrungi Nivasini dwells within the seven mountain peaks. (Sapta means seven and shrung means peaks.) It is located in Nanduri, Kalwan taluka, a small village near Nashik in India. Devotees visit this place in large numbers every day. The temple is also known popularly as one of the "three and half Shakti Peethas" of Maharashtra. The temple is also one among the 51 Shakti Peethas located on the Indian subcontinent and is a location where one of Sati's (first wife of Lord Shiva) limbs, her right arm is reported to have fallen. Its half shaktipeeth among three and half shaktipeeth of Maharashtra.

See Also

Kalighat
Renuka
Saptashrungi
Tulja Bhavani
Yatra

References

Shakti Peethas
Hindu temples in Maharashtra